Wang Rui may refer to:

 Wang Rui (chess player) (born 1978), Chinese chess Grandmaster
 Wang Rui (figure skater), Chinese ice dancer
 Wang Rui (Chinese footballer), plays for Guangzhou Evergrande Taobao F.C. and China national U-23 team
 Wang Rui (Taiwanese footballer) (born 1993), plays for National Taiwan University of Physical Education and Sport football team and Chinese Taipei national team
 Wang Rui (curler) (born 1995), Chinese curler
 Wang Rui (diver), competed in the 1997 FINA Diving World Cup
 Wang Rui (judoka) (born 1990), Chinese judoka